Younes El Aynaoui was the defending champion but did not compete that year.

Roger Federer won in the final 6–1, 6–4 against Jarkko Nieminen. He did not lose a single set in the entire tournament.

Seeds

  Roger Federer (champion)
  Paradorn Srichaphan (second round)
  Sjeng Schalken (quarterfinals)
  Rainer Schüttler (quarterfinals)
  Yevgeny Kafelnikov (semifinals, retired because of a neck injury)
  Mikhail Youzhny (quarterfinals)
  Tim Henman (second round)
  Jarkko Nieminen (final)

Draw

Finals

Top half

Bottom half

External links
 2003 BMW Open Singles draw

2003 ATP Tour
2003 BMW Open